The Sound of Fishsteps (Balık İzlerinin Sesi in Turkish) is a prize-winning novel by Turkish writer Buket Uzuner originally published in Turkish by Remzi Kitabevi in 1993 and in English translation in 2002.

Plot summary
Turkish prodigy Afife Piri, a descendant of Ottoman-Turkish cartographer Piri Reis, is invited, along with 87 other international selects, to take part in a UN sponsored retreat in an unnamed Scandinavian city. At the retreat she encounters a man claiming to be the French novelist Romain Gary, with whom she falls in love, and the descendants of other iconoclastic geniuses including Joan of Arc, Anaïs Nin, Jawaharlal Nehru and Edvard Grieg. The mysterious director of the retreat, Dr. Gunnar, however, has a secret agenda that is slowly revealed.

Awards
Awarded the 1993 Yunus Nadi Novel Prize.

External links
Extract from Sounding Fish Traces at Bogazici University website.

References

1993 novels
Turkish novels